All Singles Best ~Thanx 10th Anniversary~ is the second compilation album by Japanese singer and songwriter Rina Aiuchi. It was released on 16 December 2009 by Giza Studio, in celebration of the 10th anniversary of the singer's debut. The album contains all her thirty-three singles from the singer's first seven studio albums, as well as three new songs which were released as singles. The standard edition of the album contained the previously unreleased song, "Gift". The compilation album superseded Single Collection (2003), which contained twelve of the singer's first fifteen singles, except "Ohh! Paradise Taste!!", "Faith" and "Over Shine".

All Singles Best ~Thanx 10th Anniversary~ reached number seven on the Oricon albums chart and has sold over 38,109 copies. Eventually the album became the 204th best-selling album of 2010 in Japan.

Background
In October 2009, Aiuchi announced the release of All Singles Best ~Thanx 10th Anniversary~. The compilation album was released in two editions, limited edition and standard edition. While the limited edition was accompanied with the concert DVD from Rina Matsuri 2009 -Thanx Very Much- Request Count Down and the photobook, the standard edition included the previously unreleased bonus track, "Gift". Ahead of the release, all the songs on the album were digitally remastered.

Promotion

Live performances
On 20 December 2009, to promote the album, Aiuchi performed "Koi wa Thrill, Shock, Suspense" and "Magic" at the Amerikamura in Chūō-ku, Osaka with no prior announcement. In February 2010, Aiuchi held a promotional concert tour, titled Rina Aiuchi Thanx 10th Anniversary Live -Magic of the Love- in support of the album. The tour was held in the two venues, Shibuya Public Hall in Tokyo and Amagasaki Archaic Hall in Hyogo. The concert was recorded and released as a video album in July 2010, simultaneously with her single, "Hanabi".

Singles
The double A-side single, "Story"/"Summer Light" was released as the first single from the album on 22 July 2009. The single was a commercial success peaking at number eight on the Oricon Weekly Singles Chart in Japan.
The second single from the album, "Magic" was released on 21 October 2009. Although it only managed to peak at number seventeen in Japan, the single sold slightly better than the previous single, selling over 8,590 copies nationwide. "Magic" served as the theme song to the anime television series, Case Closed.

Commercial performance
All Singles Best ~Thanx 10th Anniversary~ debuted at number seven on the Oricon weekly albums chart, selling 23,028 copies in its first week. The album has sold over 38,109 copies so far and became 204th best-selling album of 2010 in Japan, as well as Aiuchi's best-selling album since Delight (2006).

Track listing

Charts

Weekly charts

Monthly charts

Certification and sales

|-
! scope="row"| Japan (RIAJ)
| 
| 38,109 
|-
|}

Release history

References 

2009 compilation albums
Being Inc. compilation albums
Giza Studio albums
Japanese-language compilation albums